What About Me may refer to:
What About Me (film), a 1993 film featuring Richard Hell

Albums
What About Me? (1 Giant Leap album), 2009
What About Me (Anne Murray album), 1968
What About Me? (Kenny Rogers album), 1984
What About Me (Quicksilver Messenger Service album), 1970, or the title song 
What About Me? (Nicole album), 1986

Songs
"What About Me" (Anne Murray song), 1973
"What About Me?" (Kenny Rogers song), 1984
"What About Me" (Moving Pictures song), 1982, also covered by Shannon Noll
"What About Me" (Haddaway song), 1997
"What About Me?", a song by Emily Osment from her debut EP, All the Right Wrongs
"What About Me", a song by Cascada from Evacuate the Dancefloor
"What About Me", a song by The Cribs from The Cribs (album)
"What About Me", a song by Lil Wayne from Tha Carter V
"What About Me", a song by Finnish singer Isac Elliot
"What About Me?", a song by Snarky Puppy from We Like It Here